Ready is a 2011 Indian Hindi-language masala film directed by Anees Bazmee. Produced by T-Series Films, Rawail Grandsons Entertainment and Software Pvt. Ltd., Sohail Khan Productions and Eros International, the film is the official remake of the 2008 Telugu film of the same name directed by Srinu Vaitla. The film stars Salman Khan and Asin Thottumkal in their second film together after London Dreams. Ready was distributed by Wave Cinemas and One Up Entertainment. Khan also narrated the film, while the story was written by Gopimohan and Kona Venkat.

Principal photography commenced in June 2010. The film was shot in Sri Lanka, Bangkok and Mumbai. First look poster was launched on 5 April 2011. Theatrically released worldwide on 2 June 2011, Ready broke all the records for a non-holiday film  It grossed 120 crore net in India against its 30 crore budget, and the lifetime global collection was 180 crore. The film received mixed reviews from critics, with praise for its music, humor and Khan's performance, but criticism for its length and script.

A spiritual sequel titled Ready 2 was announced in July 2018. Owing to Asin's retirement from films after her marriage, it has been confirmed that she wouldn't be returning to the sequel.

Plot
Prompt-witted, Prem helps his friend Khushi elope with her lover Raju. This angers her father Abhinav and the Kapoors. Prem pacifies his family who fix his marriage with a woman, Pooja. Sanjana, who just ran away from her wedding hears Prem telling his uncle about ditching Pooja. As the Kapoors haven't met her yet, Sanjana poses as her and stays with and soon wins over the Kapoors. Her maternal uncles Amar and Suraj search for a groom to get her still married.
Suraj's son Aryan lapses into coma due to Prem who finds out Sanjana's identity, but they fall in love.

Suraj takes Sanjana away. Despite of the truth, the Kapoors still want her as Prem's wife. Promising Sanjana that he will find a way to marry her, Prem poses as the nephew of Balli, a chartered accountant who serves Amar and Suraj. Soon the Kapoors trick Chaudharys to let Sanjana marry Prem. Aryan recovers and reveals about Prem who then explains how Sanjana's late mother Geeta wanted their union and get her married. Amar and Suraj realise their mistake and are forgiven. In the end, Prem and Sanjana get married and click away their wedding pictures.

Cast

 Salman Khan as Prem Kapoor: Sumitra and Ram's son; Bharat and Laxman's nephew; Khushi's friend; Sanjana's husband
 Asin Thottumkal as Sanjana Singh Kapoor / Pooja Malhotra (Fake): Geeta's daughter; Ishwar's granddaughter; Amar and Suraj's niece; Arjun and Aryan's cousin; Pooja's imposter; Prem's wife
 Paresh Rawal as Balidaan Bhardwaj alias Balli: Amar and Suraj's serving chartered accountant; Shakuntala's husband
 Mahesh Manjrekar as Ram Kapoor alias KK Modi: Bharat and Laxman's brother; Sumitra's husband; Prem's father
 Anuradha Patel as Sumitra Kapoor: Ram's wife; Prem's mother
 Aastha Gill as Olivia
 Manoj Joshi as Bharat Kapoor alias BK Modi: Ram and Laxman's brother; Suman's husband; Prem's uncle
 Prachee Pathak as Suman Kapoor: Bharat's wife; Prem's aunt
 Manoj Pahwa as Laxman Kapoor alias Mr. Samrat Mathur: Ram and Bharat's brother; Sheila's husband; Prem's uncle 
 Kiran Ahuja as Sheila Kapoor alias Mrs. Yatika Mathur: Laxman's wife; Prem's aunt
 Puneet Issar as Ishwar Chaudhary: Geeta, Amar and Suraj's father; Sanjana, Arjun and Aryan's grandfather; Junior Amar's great-grandfather
 Sharat Saxena as Suraj Chaudhary: Ishwar's son; Geeta and Amar's brother; Shalini's husband; Sanjana and Arjun's uncle; Aryan's father
 Praveena Deshpande as Shalini Chaudhary alias Shalu: Suraj's wife; Sanjana and Arjun's aunt; Aryan's mother
 Akhilendra Mishra as Amar Chaudhary: Ishwar's son; Geeta and Suraj's brother; Radhika's husband; Sanjana and Aryan's uncle; Arjun's father; Junior Amar's grandfather
 Gargi Patel as Radhika Chaudhary: Amar's wife; Sanjana and Aryan's aunt; Arjun's mother; Junior Amar's grandmother
 Nikitin Dheer as Aryan Chaudhary: Shalini and Suraj's son; Ishwar's grandson; Geeta, Amar and Veer's nephew; Sanjana and Arjun's cousin
 Arya Babbar as Veer Chandra Tyagi: The husband of Shalini's sister; Aryan's uncle
 Eva Grover as Aisha Chaudhary: Arjun's wife; Junior Amar's mother
 Mohit Baghel as Amar Chaudhary Jr. alias Chhota Amar: Aisha and Arjun's son; Radhika and Amar's grandson; Ishwar's great-grandson
 Jaswinder Gardner as Shakuntala Bhardwaj alias Shaku: Balidaan's wife
 Sudesh Lehri as Lehri
 Arun Bali as Guruji
 Hemant Pandey as Chhotey Guruji
 Mithilesh Chaturvedi as Abhinav Pathak: Khushi's father
 Amrita Raichand as Pooja Malhotra (Real)
 Shalini Sahuta as Naina Paronjkar: Maid of Kapoors
 Kubbra Sait as Sunaina Sethi: Maid of Kapoors
 Rajiv Kachroo as Yuvraj Mehra: The husband of Radhika's sister; Arjun's uncle

Special appearances

 Kangana Ranaut as Kiran Choksi: Gaurav's girlfriend and lover
 Zareen Khan as Khushi Pathak Sonkar: Abhinav's daughter; Prem's friend; Gaurav's ex-fiancé; Raju's wife
 Arbaaz Khan as Gaurav Kirloskar: Kiran's boyfriend and lover; Khushi's ex-fiancé 
 Ajay Devgn as Rajkumar Sonkar alias Raju: Khushi's husband
 Sanjay Dutt as Tarachand Agarwal: Marriage Registrar/Divorce Lawyer

Production
The film was originally to be shot in Mauritius. However, on the request of Salman Khan, the location was changed to Sri Lanka. Khan described his decision to choose Sri Lanka as its proximity to India and its suitable landscape for Indian productions.

Shooting started on 20 June 2010 in Colombo. The first schedule of shooting lasted for over 27 days at locations in Colombo and the neighbouring Bentota, during which approximately 40% of the filming was completed.

The second schedule of shooting was slated to start in October 2010 but was delayed due to eye problems faced by Salman Khan. The lead actor requested Anees Bazmee to delay the shoot until his condition improved. Shooting started again in Mumbai from 3 November 2010. Portions of Ready were shot at Film City in Mumbai and Cherish Studios at Madh Island in the north of Mumbai.

The final schedule of shooting started in February 2011 in Bangkok. According to reports, actors Ajay Devgan, Sanjay Dutt and Kangana Ranaut, who were shooting in Bangkok for David Dhawan's film, Rascals were called by Salman Khan to become part of the movie. The trio shot for a day doing cameo appearances. Arbaaz Khan and Zarine Khan were also confirmed to have shot for small cameos in the film. The final schedule of shooting was completed in March 2011. Two songs from Ready, "Character Dheela" and "Dhinka Chika", which were filmed in Bangkok were re-shot in Mumbai's Film City studios. According to producer Bhushan Kumar, "the whole [production] team felt that the visuals didn't suit the song." The song "Character Dheela", which features Salman Khan and Zarine Khan (in a cameo appearance) is a tribute to veteran actors Raj Kapoor, Dilip Kumar and Dharmendra.

Release
Ready’s release date was first set as 27 May but was later pushed back to 3 June. Advance bookings were opened on 29 May (five days before release) in several multiplexes. It became the first Indian film to release on at least 1000 UFO digital prints and almost 1900 prints in all. The advance at single screens matched that of Dabangg and even bettered it at places. The world premiere took place at Grand Cineplex, Dubai on 1 June 2011.

Critical response
The film received mixed reviews from critics. Nikhat Kazmi of The Times of India gave it three stars out of five saying, "The film is an unabashed ode to Salman Khan, the entertainer rather than the actor. And yes, it works at that level." Taran Adarsh of Bollywood Hungama awarded the movie four out of five saying, "On the whole, Ready is strictly for the masses and for those who relish typically formulaic masala entertainers. The film prides itself with super music ['Character Dheela' and 'Dhinka Chika'], gags and gimmicks aplenty and of course, Salman Khan, the beloved of the masses and the mainstay of this film." Filmfare also awarded four stars out of five, while commenting, "When it comes to a Salman Khan or a Rajnikant film, their performance is not important. It's the audience performance that counts." Komal Nahta of Koimoi.com gave it a rating of three and a half stars and stated, "Ready will score at the box-office, thanks to a great start, super-hit music, Salman Khan and entertainment in a good dose."

Anupama Chopra of NDTV Movies awarded two stars while commenting, "Thankfully, Ready isn't in the same soul-sucking category as director Anees Bazmee's last two movies: Thank You and No Problem. But it still falls very much into his special brand of brain-dead, anything-for-a-laugh comedy." Raja Sen of Rediff.com awarded the film one and a half stars saying, "Ready doesn't even try to make sense and therefore falls flat.....only it's more extortionate than value for money." Sonia Chopra of Sify awarded two and a half stars while commenting, "The film is unabashedly Salman-centric. He's doing it all: the wise-cracks, gregarious dancing, beating the bad guys, and romancing the girl. All this with his characteristic drawl and swagger." Kunal Guha of Yahoo! Movies gave the movie one star and stated, "...the movie refuses to end, as unnecessary confusions and complications pile up and you wonder if there's enough reel left to clear it all up." Rajeev Masand of CNN-IBN awarded the movie one and a half stars out of five, commenting "'Ready' is strictly for die-hard Salman Khan fans (are there any other kind?) who're willing to forgive the fact that this tasteless, senseless film has no plot to speak of, yet lazily unfolds over two hours and thirty minutes... Salman Khan deserves better than this." Shubhra Gupta from The Indian Express gave the film one star and said "What really kills this film is that its nonsense is neither inventive nor high energy."

Khaleej Times awarded the film three stars commenting, "Bazmi's script, a shoot off of a Telugu hit, accommodates more characters than Goa during the tourist season. Every character is over-dressed and over-the-top." Mayank Shekhar of Hindustan Times gave two stars stating, "Salman's re-grounded masala (Wanted, Dabanng) is still novel for the time being. He walks into Gaiety to briefly say hi to his audiences... It's a pop-cultural experience all right, and fully worth it." Shubha Shetty-Saha of Mid-Day rated it with two and a half stars saying, "The best thing about the movie, of course is Salman Khan. His fans will not be disappointed and yes, they will get to see him topless in the climax." Shalini Saksena of The Pioneer gave the film six out of ten saying, "Believe it or not but Salman Khan is on a roll. After the success of films like Wanted and Dabangg, he is ready with Ready which has his stamp all over it... Though there is nothing spectacular about the storyline, it manages to make you laugh." Preeti Arora from Rediff gave a score of two out of five and said "Ready isn't a tribute to Salman Khan. It's a vehicle which showcases the 'Best of Salman' one has seen over the last twenty years. It entertains in bits."

Box office

India
In India, Ready opened to an overwhelming response at the box office and packed cinema halls with single screens reporting nearly 95%–100% occupancy, while multiplexes reported 60% to 100% occupancy, depending on session times. The film collected  nett on its first day of business, thus becoming the second highest opening-day grosser across India after Dabangg. The opening weekend collections of the film have been around  nett, making it the second highest opening weekend ever as well as the biggest non-holiday weekend ever. It showed steady collections on Monday with more than  nett, and Tuesday with around  nett, taking the first week nett to  nett. The film collected  nett over its second weekend, taking the ten-day total revenue to  nett. Ready thus became the fifth in Bollywood history to collect more than  1 billion in the domestic market.

Box Office India declared it to be a 'Blockbuster'.Ready held the record for the eighth highest grossing Bollywood film ever made domestically after its theatrical run.

Overseas
In the overseas markets, the film went on to collect  from US, UK, UAE and other foreign markets over the opening weekend. It did particularly well in the United Arab Emirates grossing $1,200,000 at the end of its second weekend. In the United Kingdom, Ready grossed £495,000 while in North America, it grossed $780,000 at the end of its second weekend. The overall business from all overseas markets reached  in ten days.

Theatrical rights

Awards and nominations

Soundtrack

The music of Ready is composed by Pritam while the lyrics are penned by Amitabh Bhattacharya, Ashish Pandit, Neelesh Misra and Kumaar. It was launched on 25 April 2011 at Filmcity, Goregaon, under the banner of T-Series. The album contains four original tracks and four remixes. The item song "Ringa Ringa" from the Telugu movie Arya 2 was tweaked and composed for the film by its original composer, Devi Sri Prasad. The song underwent changes to suit the nativity of North India, an example being the change of "Ringa Ringa" to "Dhinka Chika". Composer Anu Malik alleged that the song "Character Dheela" is an unauthorised copy of his "Mohabbat Naam Hai" from the 2001 film Ajnabee. He told the media that he will likely file a suit against Pritam for plagiarism. The songwriter Turkish Mohammed Azam filed a plagiarism suit against Pritam, claiming the lyrics for "Character Dheela" were copied from a song he wrote in 2007. The Bombay High Court dismissed the case, ruling that since Pritam is not the lyricist he could not be held liable. The song Character Dheela was recreated for the movie, Shehzada, and called ‘Character Deela 2.0’.  

The film score is composed by Sandeep Shirodkar.

Reception

Joginder Tuteja of Bollywood Hungama rated the album favourably, awarding it four stars out of five, stating "with only four songs in the album, one longs to lay hands on a lot more. Nonetheless, from what is made available, there are good enough reasons to celebrate with "Dhinka Chika" and "Character Dheela" all set to be not just huge hits musically but also turn out to be massive crowd pullers. On the other hand, 'Meri Ada Bhi' ends up adding good variety to the album with 'Humko Pyaar Hua' carrying a potential to gather steam once the film releases." Sukanya Verma of Rediff while giving it two and a half stars out of five saying "Ready isn't a song-heavy album despite a ditzy remixed counterpart for each. Nor is it a game changer. Still, it's got at least two potential mass favourites, complementing its leading man's stylish, crowd-pleasing personality, to offer. And that ought to be good enough for Ready to hit steady and go." Shivesh Kumar of India Weekly awarded the album 4 out of 5 stars. Rahul Gangwani of Filmfare gave it 4 out of 5 stars quoting "Rarely do we come across music albums which completely personify the lead actor's personality. Ready does that."

See also
 List of highest-grossing Indian films

References

External links
 
 
 

T-Series (company) films
2010s Hindi-language films
2011 action comedy films
Indian action comedy films
2011 films
Films shot in Sri Lanka
2011 masala films
Films shot in Thailand
Films shot in Bangkok
Films shot in Mumbai
Films set in Thailand
Hindi remakes of Telugu films
Films featuring songs by Pritam
Films directed by Anees Bazmee
2011 comedy films